Euthera is a genus of flies in the family Tachinidae. Some North American workers place this genus in the subfamily Dexiinae.

Species
Euthera barbiellinii Bezzi, 1925
Euthera bicolor Coquillett, 1902
Euthera fascipennis (Loew, 1854)
Euthera illungnarra Cantrell, 1983
Euthera lata Cantrell, 1983
Euthera peringueyi Bezzi, 1925
Euthera rieki Paramonov, 1953
Euthera setifacies Brooks, 1945
Euthera setula Cantrell, 1983
Euthera skusei Bezzi, 1925
Euthera tentatrix Loew, 1866
Euthera tuckeri Bezzi, 1925

References

Dexiinae
Diptera of Europe
Diptera of Australasia
Diptera of Asia
Diptera of North America
Diptera of South America
Tachinidae genera
Taxa named by Hermann Loew